Diego Miranda  (born 20 January 1986) is a Paraguayan football striker. He currently plays for Gimnasia y Esgrima de Jujuy in Argentina.

External links
 
 football-lineups profile
 Argentine Primera statistics

1986 births
Living people
Paraguayan footballers
Association football forwards
Gimnasia y Esgrima de Jujuy footballers
Expatriate footballers in Argentina